The Blue Line (Line 3 & Line 4) is a metro rail line of the Delhi Metro, a rapid transit system in Delhi, India.

The Main line (Line 3) was the longest line of the Delhi Metro network until 6 August 2021, when an unfinished section between Mayur Vihar Pocket 1 and Trilokpuri Sanjay Lake stations on the Pink Line was inaugurated and it became one 59-km-long corridor.

History
The Dwarka – Barakhamba Road section of the line was inaugurated by the then Prime Minister of India, Dr. Manmohan Singh, on 31 December 2005 and opened to the public on 31 December 2005. Subsequent sections opened between Dwarka – Dwarka Sector 9 on 1 April 2006, Barakhamba Road – Indraprastha on 11 November 2006, Indraprastha – Yamuna Bank on 10 May 2009, Yamuna Bank – Noida City Centre on 12 November 2009, and Dwarka Sector 9 – Dwarka Sector 21 on 30 October 2010.

It was further extended up to Vaishali, with it opening to public on 14 July 2011. On 9 March 2019, a 6.67 km extension of the line from Noida City Centre to Noida Electronic City was opened for public by Prime Minister Narendra Modi.

Stations

Line 3 (Main Line)
Delhi Metro currently has parking facilities at 35 metro stations of the Blue line.

Line 4 (Branch Line)

Train Info

Extensions

Vaishali extension
A small extension of length  was constructed and opened on 14 July 2011 connecting Anand Vihar station of the Blue Line branch with Vaishali Metro station in Ghaziabad, a satellite city near Delhi.

Najafgarh extension (Line 9) Grey Line (Dwarka - Dhansa Bus Stand)
A branch line from Dwarka station to Najafgarh was constructed under Phase III. It was designated as the Grey Line. This line has 3 new stations. Construction work on this extension started in September 2013. The Dwarka-Najafgarh stretch opened for public operations on 4 October 2019. Another extension towards Dhansa Bus Stand became operational on 18 September 2021, after delays due to Covid-19 pandemic.

Noida extension
In April 2014, the Central government approved the extension of the line eastwards from Noida City Centre to Noida Electronic City (Sector-62). Later, the government approved an additional line starting from Noida Sector 51 to Greater Noida, which became the Aqua Line under control of the Noida Metro Rail Corporation (NMRC). This line was thrown open to public on 25 January 2019.

See also
List of Delhi Metro stations
Transport in Delhi
Delhi Metro Rail Corporation
Delhi Suburban Railway
Delhi Transport Corporation
National Capital Region (India)

References

External links

 Official Official website

Railway lines opened in 2005
Delhi Metro lines
2005 establishments in Delhi
Transport in Noida